C.P. Quattlebaum House is a historic home located at Conway in Horry County, South Carolina. It was built in 1807. It is a two-story, "T"-plan, cross-gable roofed, frame, weatherboard-clad residence.  It features a two-story, projecting, polygonal bay and two-tiered wrap around porch with sawn brackets. Its owner, Cephas Perry Quattlebaum, served as Conway's first mayor and his office is located nearby, the C.P. Quattlebaum Office.

It was listed on the National Register of Historic Places in 1986.

References

External links
Quattlebaum, C. P., House - Conway, South Carolina - U.S. National Register of Historic Places on Waymarking.com

Houses on the National Register of Historic Places in South Carolina
Houses completed in 1855
Houses in Horry County, South Carolina
National Register of Historic Places in Horry County, South Carolina
Buildings and structures in Conway, South Carolina